Mount Storm King is located within the Olympic National Park about 20 miles west of Port Angeles, Washington.

The trail to the summit starts near the Storm King Ranger Station, and initially follows the trail to Marymere Falls but branches to the north after a short distance. The first  is on maintained trail but the rest of the climb involves scrambling on loose rock with some exposure.

Legend 
Klallum tribe legend tells an origin story of Mount Storm King being angered by fighting tribes at his feet and broke a boulder from his peak, throwing it at the warriors, killing them and cutting Tsulh-mut in two creating Lake Crescent and  Lake Sutherland.

References

External links
 

Landforms of Olympic National Park
Mountains of Clallam County, Washington
Mountains of Washington (state)
Olympic Mountains